Stas or STAS may refer to:

People
Stas (given name), a reduced form of Stanislav, Anastasius or Eustachius
Stas (surname)
Stasia "Stas" Irons, musician

Other uses
School of Technology and Applied Sciences, Kerala, India
Short Term Air Supply
Science and Technology Adviser to the Secretary of State
Société de Transports de l'Agglomération Stéphanoise, a public transport executive and operator.
Stewart Army Subpost in New Windsor, NY
Superman: The Animated Series, an American animated television series based on the DC Comics superhero Superman.

See also
 STA (disambiguation) for the singular of STAs